Democratic Political Turning Point  (DPK) was a political party in the Netherlands. The party was founded by Hero Brinkman, an independent member of the House of Representatives, formerly a member of the Party for Freedom (PVV). After Brinkman left the Party for Freedom he founded the Independent Citizens' Party (OBP). On 9 June 2012, Brinkman announced that the Independent Citizens' Party was merging with the Proud of the Netherlands (TON) party to form a new party: Democratic Political Turning Point. The party participated in the Dutch general election of 2012, but did not win any seats. On 18 November 2012, TON reversed the merger and parted ways with Brinkman.

References

Conservative liberal parties
Eurosceptic parties in the Netherlands
Liberal parties in the Netherlands
Defunct nationalist parties in the Netherlands
Right-wing populism in the Netherlands
Right-wing populist parties
Political parties established in 2012
2012 establishments in the Netherlands
2012 disestablishments in the Netherlands